
Gmina Cekcyn is a rural gmina (administrative district) in Tuchola County, Kuyavian-Pomeranian Voivodeship, in north-central Poland.

The gmina contains part of the protected areas of Tuchola Landscape Park and Wda Landscape Park.

Villages
Gmina Cekcyn contains the villages and settlements of Bieszewo, Błądzim, Błądzim-Dworzec, Brzozie, Cekcyn, Cekcynek, Dębowiec, Gołąbek, Huta, Iwiec, Jelenia Góra, Karpaty, Kiełpiński Most, Knieja, Kosowo, Kowalskie Błota, Kruszka, Krzywogoniec, Lisiny, Łosiny, Lubiewice, Lubińsk, Ludwichowo, Madera, Mała Huta, Małe Budziska, Małe Gacno, Mikołajskie, Nowy Sumin, Okiersk, Okoninek, Ostrowo, Piła-Młyn, Plaskorz, Pustelnia, Rudzki Młyn, Sarnówek, Siwe Bagno, Skrajna, Sławno, Sowiniec, Stary Sumin, Stary Wierzchucin, Suchom, Świt, Szczuczanek, Szklana Huta, Trzebciny, Wielkie Budziska, Wielkie Gacno, Wielkie Koralskie Błota, Wierzchlas, Wierzchucin, Wrzosowisko, Wysoka, Zalesie, Zamarte, Zdroje and Zielonka.

Neighbouring gminas
Gmina Cekcyn is bordered by the gminas of Gostycyn, Lniano, Lubiewo, Osie, Śliwice and Tuchola.

References
Polish official population figures 2006

Cekcyn
Tuchola County